Mystery Mansion may refer to:
 
 Mystery Mansion (video game), a late 1970s text-based adventure video game
 Mystery Mansion (film), a 1983 family movie
 Mystery Mansion (board game), a board game first offered by Milton Bradley in 1984, then updated and released by Parker Brothers as an electronic version in the 1990s